Kyawkku (Myinkyado) is a town in Shan State, Myanmar. It is part of Lawksawk Township of Taunggyi District.

History
This village was the capital of Kyawkku State, one of the Shan States, until 1922.

References

Populated places in Shan State